Coleophora atrilineella is a moth of the family Coleophoridae that is endemic to Tunisia.

References

External links

atrilineella
Endemic fauna of Tunisia
Moths of Africa
Moths described in 1957